Irrumbaanadu  is a village in the Arimalamrevenue block of Pudukkottai district, Tamil Nadu, India.

Demographics 

As per the 2001 census, Irumbaanadu had a total population of 4322 with 2128 males and 2194 females. Out of the total population 2467 people were literate.

References

Villages in Pudukkottai district